Robin Summer Bartholomew (born in Merced, California) is an American actress, television personality and beauty pageant titleholder who won the Miss USA 1975 pageant.

Her first pageant experience came in 1973 when she won the Miss Heineken title. She then won the Miss California USA title in 1975 and went on to win the Miss USA crown. She competed at the Miss Universe 1975 pageant held in El Salvador and placed second-runner up to winner Anne Marie Pohtamo of Finland. Bartholomew also served as a judge for the Miss USA pageant from 1977 to 1982.

She is also known for her career on game shows. She became the hostess of the game show Sale of the Century in late 1984 after a brief period as hostess/letter turner on Wheel of Fortune in 1982. She appeared in the film Love Is Forever, with Michael Landon and Priscilla Presley.

Filmography
Love Is Forever (1982 film)
Chicago: Look Away (Video short) (1988) (Uncredited)

References

External links
 

Female models from California
Game show models
Living people
Miss Universe 1975 contestants
Miss USA 1970s delegates
Miss USA winners
People from Merced, California
Sale of the Century
21st-century American women
Year of birth missing (living people)